Kir Royal – Aus dem Leben eines Klatschreporters ("Kir Royal - from the life of a gossip reporter") is a six-part television series by Helmut Dietl from 1986. A parody of the Munich newspaper Abendzeitung, the gossip reporter  and Issuer , follows the tabloid reporter Baby Schimmerlos who plays in the Munich "Schicki-Micki" scene of the 1980s.

Plot

1. Wer reinkommt, ist drin ("who comes in, is in") 
Gossip reporter Baby Schimmerlos wrote a series about the Munich restaurants, but he had written it for the wrong crowd however.

His girlfriend, Mona, encouraged him to submit his expense report in the newspaper he works for. All of the frequent visits to expensive restaurants caused financial stress on the Schimmerlos. Such high expenses combined with their necessary household renovation, which later led them to financial ruin. The master craftsman they hired offered them a good price one the condition that the Schimmerlos write an article about him in his column. Outraged by such a suggestion, Baby rejects the offer.

During the evening where the retribution-seeking industrialist Henry Haffenloher (Mario Adorf) tried to find Baby Schimmerlos' column to see if he appeared in it, but he hadn't. Whose operator is concerned, will getaway because nothing is going on in the restaurant. He can call together "the usual freeloaders" to get some humor into the store. The plan succeeds but Mona is annoyed by the lack of ideas and culinary staged happiness. Haffenloher finds the Champs Elysées by accident but still get by, as there will be dancing on the tables.

With frustration, Haffenloher phoned Schimmerlos' publisher of balance, offers to turn to expensive ads on it if it occurs in the gossip column. This then blackmailed Schimmerlos. He would get his expenses reimbursed only if Haffenloher appears in the column.

Schimmerlos visited Haffenloher in his hotel. After flattery, threats and bribes direct Schimmerlos asleep, The Champs Elysées is the last night staged again from scratch. This time, in addition to those already present yesterday, the master craftsmen and Haffenloher.

In the end, they all get what they want. Mona and her floor, the balance of the ads, the wannabes, and the publicity restaurateurs. Only Schimmerlos who has acted against his conviction sits alone in a corner, smoking and drinking to the music of the Can-Can from the operetta Orpheus in the Underworld.

2. Muttertag ("mother's day") 
Baby Schimmerlos' mother with heart disease and living in poverty is to visit Baby at home to clean his apartment and the boy finally serve up a decent meal, but what she finds is neither Baby nor Mona, but another woman in Baby's bed. Baby's like always on the move in search of the story. A famous actress is said to be pregnant, and Baby can also scheming workers of scare on the set and even threats not to investigate the matter. Finally, he prints, but the news of the pregnancy without any proof. At an official reception, it will be a showdown between Baby, the irate producers and Mona, who has now experienced by Baby's affair, including an evil end for Baby's mother.

3. Das Volk sieht nichts ("the people see nothing") 
Baby Schimmerlos thinks you've landed the big coup. His old friend, Hubert Dürkheimer (Boy Gobert), intended to help the most prestigious. Lake Starnberg wanted to build a country club, but for the building still lacks a lot that he wants the community not sell it. Baby will occur as a straw man to under his name - funded by his friend Hubert - to buy the property.

But even when the funding is to be reality, Baby realizes that not everything will work out as he dreams it so beautiful. Politicians, old friends, not to mention Mona also make sure that everything turns out differently.

4. Adieu Claire ("goodbye Claire") 
In Munich, for a change, is finding time no story. Except for a fall fashion taste, even the Edda and Mona is, far and wide, nothing newsworthy in sight. As Baby Schimmerlos becomes desperate to fill a three-quarter page of gossip, even a policeman caught him at Zeitungsklau for research purposes.

When it all seems to go against Baby is fortunately still a promising story. The composer Frederick Danziger (Curt Bois) is dying and the woman he has loved for 50 years, has lived in France during the Nazi period and has vowed never again to set foot on German soil.

Baby researched only in the clinic of the terminally ill and even with Herbie and Mona in Paris to the beloved singer in Germany and then the big thing to bring out. 
But behind Baby's back pulling the strings and other great journalistic ends, unfortunately, only in a final toast to the Chief of Police.

5. Königliche Hoheit ("royal highness") 
The Queen of the far country Mandalia (Michaela May) is for a visit in Munich.

Herbie and Baby smell, of course, the perfect story, and even research the history of the princess before her arrival. The former hairdresser Munich seems to have omitted nothing in his early years. To make things perfect, rent the two rooms in the hotel next to the queen and find out where things not at all correspond to their category. The Queen is apparently only in Munich in order to strengthen the fight against the opposition in their home country with weapons bought in Germany from arms dealer Hugo Raeber (Paul Hubschmid). 
Baby is morally by Mona and providing even more problems.

6. Karriere ("career") 
Baby Schimmerlos is bored by his work and his columns are always thin. Instead, he spies on with Herbie the billionaire Banz. His goal: to uncover the secret perversions of the richest man of the republic. Because of the darkness, but no useful first shots possible. Mona has fun at the same time at a reception and enchanted the guests with her singing. As a child, Mona dreamed of a career as a singer. Animated by her friend Peggy, a music producer, Mona takes on a demo tape, but must first find their own style. Baby is not enthusiastic, because they so neglected her domestic duties. Mrs. von Unruh, meanwhile, makes the search for a successor to Baby. Undeterred, chasing after this with Herbie's story. The patience of the two is eventually rewarded: A lighted carriage passed the two, clad in Banz, as King Louis, and a man dressed as Sissi. Baby senses a sensation. At night it comes between Mona and Baby to a confrontation in which she laments his lack of interest in her and announced, now to make a career. The next morning, Baby faces the decision: its hot story to pursue or chase Mona, which opens itself to act as a singer. He opts for the latter and found provocative Mona and chanson singing in front of an establishment. He expressed his skepticism and even prohibit, Mona wants to sing. Then separate the two. Wife of Unruh's displeasure is meanwhile getting bigger, so she announces Baby in his absence. When trying to sneak in Banz's estate, and Herbie are Baby and asked them to make an interesting offer: half a million for her silence. After a brief dispute Herbie acknowledged the receipt of money. Baby is not enthusiastic about it, just like the fact that Mona's likeness adorns the hoardings in the city. At night, he watched a performance at Mona, is taking nothing.

Actors 
 Franz Xaver Kroetz: Baby Schimmerlos
 Dieter Hildebrandt: photographer Herbie Fried
 Senta Berger: Mona
 : secretary Edda Pfaff
 Ruth Maria Kubitschek: Friederike von Unruh

External links
 

1986 German television series debuts
1986 German television series endings
Television shows set in Munich
German-language television shows
Das Erste original programming
Grimme-Preis for fiction winners